The String Quartet No. 5 in E-flat major, Op. 44, No. 3, was composed by Felix Mendelssohn in 1837–1838 and completed on February 6, 1838. The piece is part of the Op. 44 set of 3 string quartets that Mendelssohn dedicated to the Crown Prince of Sweden.

Movements 

Like all of Mendelssohn's string quartets, this work has four movements:

 Allegro vivace
 Scherzo: Assai leggiero vivace
 Adagio non troppo
 Molto allegro con fuoco

A typical performance lasts around 35 minutes.

Robin Wildstein Garvin has suggested that the slow movement belongs to the 'religious adagio type', deriving from organ pieces that aimed to inspire religious contemplation through a devotional atmosphere. It follows a ternary form with a new theme presented in the B section.

References

External links 

String quartets by Felix Mendelssohn
1838 compositions
Compositions in E-flat major